Beijing No. 8 High School is a public beacon secondary school (Grade 7–12) located in Xicheng District, Beijing, People's Republic of China. The school has been one of the best secondary schools in Beijing for nearly a century. It was accredited as "Municipal Model High School" by the Beijing Municipal Commission of Education. It is a model school for Scientific and Technological Practice, a member of the Association of Youth Technology Education, a National Established School of Sports in Beijing, a Member School of the Chinese Radio Sports Association and a member of the Jinfan Orchestra. As the Olympics approached, the school improved its stadiums and was chosen as the training place for trampoline and swimming athletes, the only school to undertake two missions at the same time. The school's stadiums are now available to the public, including a standard soccer field, a 400-meter runway, an underground running training center, a swimming pool and several standard basketball fields.  In recent years, there are about 40 graduates every year admitted to Peking University and Tsinghua University. This number accounts for nearly one-fifth of graduates each year.

History of No.8 Middle School

Former Si Cun Middle School
1921: Beijing No.8 Middle school was founded as Si Cun Middle School.
1949: The Si Cun Middle School was merged with Peking No. 8 Middle School and changed to its present name.

No.8 Middle School

1950: The school moved to its previous schoolhouse located in An Yuan alley.
1984: The school was chosen as the experimental unit of educational renovation.
1985: The Experimental Class for Exceptionally Gifted Children was established.
1992: In accordance to Financial Street municipal construction plans, No.8 Middle School started building new schoolhouse.

1999: The junior high section moved to the present schoolhouse, located at 2 Xibianmen East st., Xicheng District.
2000: The senior high section moved to its present schoolhouse located at 2 Xueyuan Xiaojie, Xicheng District.
2006: The school started construction with its senior high section in preparation for the 2008 Beijing Olympics.
2008: Construction finished and the school became the only one within 2nd ring road equipped with standard elevated sports field.

Facilities 
The school is divided into junior high part and senior high part. Both parts are equipped with labs, choir rooms, orchestra rooms, basketball courts and other facilities.

The Biological Technology Experiment Center 
The biological technology experiment zone was installed in 2002, after the National Bureau of Education introduced the Curriculum Plan of National High Schools (experimental edition) in 2001.1. The center consists of a tissue culturing lab, a sterile operating room, and a molecular biology lab. The labs are well-equipped, the equipments include a PCR instrument and eight sterile operating tables as well as other basic necessities. The labs are surrounded by double-layer glass and can be observed from the outside. Students interested in biological experiment are encouraged to conduct simulated scientific research within the labs, and students from different high schools across Beijing take part in the experiments in this center.

Faculty 
Currently, the school has over a hundred faculty members. The students to faculty ratio is around 10 to 1.

Academics 
The school provides curriculum mainly to prepare students for NCEE (National College Entrance Examination, "Gao Kao") and High School Entrance Examination (Zhong Kao). As the school is among the most prestigious high schools, 99 out of 100 of Beijing No.8 High School graduates matriculate into Chinese top universities. In 2013, Beijing No.8 High School started providing selected students with international curriculum, including English Language Arts and AP courses in addition to regular Chinese classes. Besides the newly established international department, Beijing No.8 High School has offered an international track for more than seven years. A special class is arranged for students who intend to study abroad after graduation.

Notable alumni 
Deng Jiaxian, Chinese nuclear physicist. Leading engineer and key contributor to the first Chinese nuclear weapon programs.
Chia-Chiao Lin, an applied mathematician and Institute Professor Emeritus at MIT. Former President of the Society for Industrial and Applied Mathematics.
Liang Shoupan, rocket scientist and the chief designer of C-101 and C-301 AShM.
Hou Yimin, artist. One of the chief designers for the 3rd and 4th series of Renminbi.
Jia Chunwang, former Procurator-General of the Supreme People's Procuratorate, the equivalent of Attorney General in the American judicial system.
Xu Yongyue, former Minister of State Security of the People's Republic of China.
Zhou Xiaochuan, Governor of the People's Bank of China and a prominent economist. Longest serving central bank chief since the founding of PRC.
Shen Xiangfu, a Chinese football coach and a former international football player. Joint Manager of the Regional Preferente de la Comunitat Valenciana.
Peng Zhao, is a Chinese-American businessman known as the CEO of Citadel Securities LLC.

See also 

 List of schools in Xicheng District

References

External links

Official Website

Schools in Xicheng District
High schools in Beijing